The Time is the second album and first full-length studio album of Chinese singer-songwriter Xu Weizhou. It is divided into four parts.

Background and release

1st Quarter — 15 Minutes for Craziness:

The 1st quarter consists of 3 songs, namely: "So What", "Leave Me Alone" and "Edge of Darkness". It was produced by Lee Shih Shiong.

Timmy Xu Studio shared a 37-second highlight medley teaser of the 3 songs on 6 August 2017. Pre-sale has started on 8 August and was officially released on 10 August. The album reached platinum record status in just 3 minutes and 3 seconds and in a day, it has sold over 400,000 copies earning a double platinum record. The day of its release, The Time album ranked first on QQ Music real-time chart and the online topic "Xu Weizhou The Time" reached more than 100 million reading within an hour.

The official music video of "Leave Me Alone" was released on 21 August while "So What" on 11 September at several Chinese streaming sites as well as YouTube. Both music video were shot in London. On 2 April 2018, the official music video of "Edge of Darkness" was released exclusively through the NetEase Music streaming service.

2nd Quarter — 15 Minutes for Radiance:

Xu released the whole 2nd quarter on 20 October 2017; same day of his 23rd birthday for free online. It consists of 3 songs, namely: "Glory", "Between Us" and "It's Always You".

The official music video of "It's Always You" was released on 31 October at Miaopai and other Chinese streaming sites.

3rd Quarter — 15 Minutes for Monologue:

On 12 December 2017, the third quarter was released. It consists of one song and an audio of Xu talking. The track titles were "Cat" and "Confession". "Cat" was dedicated for Xu's fans and was written and produced by himself while the other one was Xu's "Confession" to "Baizhou" (his official fanclub). Xu also participated in designing the album cover. Before of its official release, Xu performed "Cat" on his Light 2017 concert in Shanghai on 9 December.

4th Quarter — 15 Minutes for Fantasy:

The last quarter was officially released on 31 January 2018.  It consists of 3 songs, namely: "Orange Sky", "Maze" and "Rio". "Maze" was first released as a Chinese promotional song for the American film Maze Runner: The Death Cure on 24 January with some clips of the upcoming movie. The album cover was taken by an internationally renowned photographer Leslie Kee.

On 8 February, the official music video of "Orange Sky" was released. It was released at several Chinese streaming sites as well as  Sony Music Taiwan's YouTube channel.

Live performances

Xu first performed "So What" live followed by "Leave Me Alone" during the iQiyi Screaming Night Concert on 19 August 2017 and 2017 Fresh Asia Music Awards on 27 August, respectively. On 25 November, Xu performed "Glory" for the first time on television and won the weekly CCTV Global Chinese Music Chart.

On 9 December 2017, Xu held a concert in Shanghai entitled Light 2017. He performed all his songs from the first two quarters of "The Time" and a new song from the next quarter entitled "Cat" as well as some songs on his previous album Light. All tickets were sold out within 30 seconds.

Critical reception
The 1st quarter has garnered positive reviews from music critics and music bloggers and 13 well-known music personnels and companies as well as 2 fans where invited to ask Xu regarding his album on Sina Weibo.

Deng Ke, a famous music critic said that normally, an idol singer won't write or sing something hardcore but he said that he particularly like "Fading into the Night" out of the three which is quite popular. He also added that "a singer should follow through his heart.." and "..the audience will naturally recognize it".

Zhao Nanfang, also a music critic and an author from Toutiao praised that naming the 1st quarter "15 minutes for craziness" can be effective, has a very strong attraction and fully fit Xu's own singer physique because rock music is Xu's personal preference and it's an important way to identify singers. He also praised the 2nd quarter upon its release and compared it to the previous quarter.

Upon releasing the 2nd quarter, netizens praised the improvement of Xu's English pronunciation to his second pure English song "It's Always You".

Track listing

Chart performance

Weekly

References

2017 albums